St. John's East-Quidi Vidi is a provincial electoral district in Newfoundland and Labrador. As of 2016 there were 14,381 people living in the district.

St. John's East-Quidi Vidi includes part of the city of St. John's. The district was created following the 2015 electoral districts boundaries review. The district includes parts of the former districts of St. John's East, Signal Hill-Quidi Vidi and St. John's Centre.

The district was considered fairly safe for the NDP and was represented by  Newfoundland and Labrador NDP leader Alison Coffin until the 2021 election, when she was defeated by Liberal John Abbott. With the margin of victory only 53 votes, Coffin requested a recount, but was denied by the Newfoundland and Labrador Supreme Court, as the province's electoral law stated that recounts were only automatically triggered if the margin of victory was less than 10 votes.

Members of the House of Assembly
The district has elected the following Members of the House of Assembly:

Election results

References

Newfoundland and Labrador provincial electoral districts
Politics of St. John's, Newfoundland and Labrador